Kashmira Irani is an Indian film, television and theatre actress known for playing Amber in Amber Dhara, Draupadi in Dharmakshetra and Samaira Khanna in Dosti... Yaariyan... Manmarziyan ,Princess Sonali in the musical Zangoora-The Gypsy Prince. She’s played pivotal roles in films like Rangoon ,Tiger Zinda ha, and Bharat.

Early life
Irani was born in 1986 and brought up in Pune, Maharashtra to an Irani Zoroastrian family. She moved to Mumbai from Pune when she was 17 years old to pursue her passion for acting. Prior to her acting debut, she assisted her cousin in fashion designing and worked as an assistant stylist.

Career
Irani made her debut on the television industry with the hit TV series Amber Dhara, where she played the title role of Amber. The story was of conjoined twins, and required her to be conjoined with her co-actor (Sulagna Panigrahi) who played Dhara  for 8–9 months. She won the Best Debutant Award for this role at the Sansui Television Awards.

In 2009, she appeared on a telefilm based on the 26/11 terror attacks in Mumbai called Un Hazaaron Ke Naam, in which she played the role of Jyoti, a rich brat. The story dealt with how the attacks transformed her to be more socially responsible towards her society. The following year, she had a role in Yash Chopra's TV series Seven on Sony Entertainment Television. The series was about seven extraordinary people who possess supernatural powers and how they help get rid of the evil from society. She played the role of Varya Vishwamitra, a girl who can control the weather.

She played the lead as Princess Sonali in a play called Zangoora: The Gypsy Prince, which was the first Bollywood musical ever. It premiered on 23 September 2010 at Kingdom of Dreams and became the longest-running Bollywood stage show in India. In June 2013, the musical completed over 1000 successful shows at Nautanki Mahal, Gurgaon. This character has been her most challenging role so far as it's her first time on a live stage and has also required her to do aerial choreography. Zangoora and her role have been well received by audiences.

After doing the musical for four successful years, she went to acting and dance classes in New York City, while working with an acting coach there in the city.

In 2014, she appeared briefly as a stage actress performing an aerial dance at Kingdom of Dreams in PK starring Aamir Khan and Anushka Sharma. She performed an aerial dance to the song " Love is a Waste of Time".

She came into the limelight for her role as Samaira on the popular television series Dosti... Yaariyan... Manmarziyan.

Filmography
{| class="wikitable sortable"
|-
! Year !! Title !! Role !! Note
|-
| 2007– 2008|| Amber Dhara || Amber || 
|-
| 2009 || Un Hazaaron Ke Naam || Jyoti  || 
|-
| 2010 || Seven || Varya Vishwamithra  || 
|-
| 2014 || Dharmakshetra|| Draupadi  ||  
|-
| 2014 ||  PK  || Aerial dancer || Special appearance in Love Is A Waste Of Time
|-
| 2015|| Dosti... Yaariyan... Manmarziyan || Samaira Khanna  ||  
|-
| 2017 ||  Tiger Zinda Hai  || Sana || 
|-
| 2017 ||Rangoon || Zenobia Billimoria || 
|-
| 2019 ||Bharat || Mahek ||
|-
|2020 ||Welcome Home || Anuja Rao ||
|-
|2022 || Modern Love Mumbai  || Rehana ||
|-
|2022 ||Shoorveer || ||
|}

Theatre
 Zangoora – The Gypsy Prince''

References

External links
 
 
 

Living people
Year of birth missing (living people)
21st-century Indian actresses
Actresses from Mumbai
Actresses from Pune
Actresses in Hindi television
Female models from Mumbai
Indian soap opera actresses
Indian television actresses
Irani people